The 2022–23 Bangalore Super Division season was the 20th season of the Bangalore Super Division, the fourth tier league in Indian football system, and Karnataka's top-tier football league. Bengaluru United were the defending champions.

Changes from last season

Relegated to A Division
 ADE (reinstated for league expansion)

Promoted from A Division
 Rebels FC
 Friends United FC

Direct entrants
 Roots FC
 FC Agniputhra
 SC Bengaluru

Regular season

League table

Matches

*Jawahar Union withdrew

See also
2022–23 Indian State Leagues
2022–23 Chennai Senior Division
2022–23 Kerala Premier League

References

Bangalore Super Division seasons
2022–23 in Indian football leagues
2022–23 in Indian football